Ophonus rebellus is a species of ground beetle in the subfamily Harpalinae, genus Ophonus, and subgenus Ophonus (Hesperophonus).

References

rebellus
Beetles described in 1926